Lycodon tiwarii, commonly known as the Andaman wolf snake and Tiwari's wolf snake, is a species of snake in the family Colubridae. The species is native to the Andaman Islands and Nicobar Islands of India.

Etymology
The specific name, tiwarii, is in honor of Indian zoologist Krishna Kant Tiwari.

Reproduction
L. tiwarii is oviparous.

References

Further reading
Whitaker R, Captain A (2008). Snakes of India: The Flield Guide. Cennai: Draco Books. 495 pp. .

tiwarii
Snakes of India
Endemic fauna of India
Fauna of the Andaman and Nicobar Islands
Reptiles described in 1965